The Zion Christian Academy is a private, interdenominational evangelical Christian school, serving preschool-Grade 12.

See also

 List of high schools in Tennessee
 Zion Presbyterian Church

References

External links
 

501(c)(3) organizations
1979 establishments in Tennessee
Buildings and structures in Maury County, Tennessee
Christian schools in Tennessee
Educational institutions established in 1979
Nondenominational Christian schools in the United States
Preparatory schools in Tennessee
Private schools in Tennessee
Schools in Maury County, Tennessee